By-elections to Natham and Thiruvattar constituencies were held in Tamil Nadu, India, on 5 and 11 September 1999 respectively. Elections for three state assembly constituencies, Nellikuppam, Tiruchirappalli - II and Arantangi  were held on 17 February 2000.

In the first phase, TMC lost a seat to AIADMK and Dravida Munnetra Kazhagam (DMK) lost a seat to Communist Party of India (Marxist) (CPI (M)). In the second phase, AIADMK splinter party MADMK, was able to pick up a seat from AIADMK and DMK was able to hold on to its seats.

Results

 The number on the left, in the table, represents the total number of MLAs after the by-election, and the number in parenthesis represents, the seats picked up or lost due to the by-election
 The numbers presented for 1996, represents, the alliance, when the TMC and the left allied with the DMK.

Constituents and results
Source: Election Commission of India

Natham

Thiruvattar
Source: Tamil Nadu Legislative Assembly

Nellikuppam

Tiruchirappalli - II

Arantangi

See also
1.  ECI By-election page

References

State Assembly elections in Tamil Nadu
1990s in Tamil Nadu
2000s in Tamil Nadu
By-elections in Tamil Nadu
1999 State Assembly elections in India
2000 State Assembly elections in India